Use Your Voice is the fourth album by Mason Jennings. It was released in 2004 on Architect Records and Bar/None Records.

Track listing 
 "Crown" – 3:04
 "The Light (Part II)" – 3:08
 "Empire Builder" – 2:38
 "Fourteen Pictures" – 3:07
 "Lemon Grove Avenue" – 3:52
 "Keepin It Real" – 3:12
 "Ballad of Paul and Sheila" – 3:27
 "Southern Cross" – 3:19
 "Drinking as Religion" – 2:41
 "Ulysses" – 3:23

References 

2004 albums
Mason Jennings albums